Pareši is a village in the municipality of Centar Župa, North Macedonia.

Name
The name of the village is derived from a personal name Pare, from Pampar, with the suffix eš(i) and the toponym is probably Albanian.

Demographics
The village when inhabited in past times had an Orthodox Macedonian speaking population.

According to the 2002 census, the village had a total of 0 inhabitants.

References

Villages in Centar Župa Municipality